A mythomoteur (compound of the French words for myth and engine) is the constitutive myth that gives an ethnic group its sense of purpose. The term was first used in this context by Ramon d’Abadal i de Vinyals, and was later taken up by John Armstrong in his book Nations before Nationalism. It has subsequently become a common theme in Anthony D. Smith’s work on ethnicity and nationalism, particularly his book The Ethnic Origins of Nations. Three types of mythomoteur have been identified, the communal-political, the communal-religious, and the dynastic.

Examples
Serbs: Kosovo Myth
Romanians: Protochronism
Gikûyû: Ngai

See also 

 National myth
 National epic

Notes

Bibliography

Ethnic studies
Origin myths